Robert Aldrich  (born July 29, 1954, in New York) is an Australian historian and writer. Aldrich is a Professor of European History, he teaches and researches modern European and colonial history, including the history of France since the Revolution, the history of the French and British overseas empires, the history of 'sites of memory' and the history of gender and sexuality.

Life 
After school Aldrich studied history in the United States of America, first at Emory University, Georgia, where he received his undergraduate degree, and afterwards at Brandeis University, Massachusetts, where he gained his Master's and PhD.

Aldrich joined the faculty at University of Sydney. He wrote several books on French colonialism in the Pacific and on the history of homosexuality.

Awards and recognition

In 2002 the French Government awarded Aldrich the Chevalier dans l'Ordre des Palmes Académiques. In 2008 he was elected a Fellow of both the Academy of the Social Sciences in Australia and the Australian Academy of the Humanities.

Works 
 An Economic and Social History of Europe, two volumes (1987) (with Frank Tipton)
 The French Presence in the South Pacific, 1842–1940 (1990)
 France's Overseas Frontier: Départements et Territoires d'Outre-Mer (together with John Connell) (1992)
 France and the South Pacific since 1940 (1993)
 The Seduction of the Mediterranean: Writing, Art and Homosexual Fantasy (1993)
 Greater France: A History of French Overseas Expansion (1996)
 The Last Colonies (1998)
 Who's Who in gay and lesbian history (2001) (together with Garry Wotherspoon)
 Colonialism and Homosexuality (2003)
 Vestiges of the Colonial Empire in France: Monuments, Museums and Colonial Memories (2005)
 Gay Life and Culture: A World History, published by Thames & Hudson (2006) (German translation: Gleich und Anders – Eine Globale Geschichte der Homosexualität, Murmann Verlag) (2007)
 The Age of Empires, published by Thames & Hudson (2007)
 Gay Lives, published by Thames & Hudson (2012) (UK title, Gay Life Stories)

References

External links 
 University Sydney:Robert Aldrich 
 “Die-hard homophobes are now on the defensive” – interview with Robert Aldrich, intercultural magazine "unique" (issue nr. 65, published 2013)

1954 births
20th-century Australian historians
Brandeis University alumni
Emory University alumni
Academic staff of the University of Sydney
Australian gay writers
Historians of LGBT topics
Living people
Writers from New York (state)
Chevaliers of the Ordre des Palmes Académiques
Fellows of the Academy of the Social Sciences in Australia
Fellows of the Australian Academy of the Humanities
American emigrants to Australia
21st-century Australian historians